This list of museums in Ohio is a list of museums, defined for this context as institutions (including nonprofit organizations, government entities, and private businesses) that collect and care for objects of cultural, artistic, scientific, or historical interest and make their collections or related exhibits available for public viewing. Museums that exist only in cyberspace or on the Internet (i.e., virtual museums) are not included. Also included are non-profit and university art galleries.
 See also List of museums in Cincinnati.
 See also List of museums in Cleveland.
 See also List of museums in Columbus, Ohio.

Museums

Defunct museums 
 American Gas Pump Heaven, Dover, closed in 2016
 America's Ice Cream & Dairy Museum, Medina, closed in 2010
 Cleveland Health Museum, AKA HealthSpace Cleveland, merged in 2007 with the Cleveland Museum of Natural History
 Degenhart Paperweight and Glass Museum, Cambridge, closed in 2011, portion of the collection relocated to the Museum of American Glass located in Weston, WV
 Ely Chapman Foundation West African Museum, Marietta
 Hauck House Museum, Cincinnati, no longer open as a museum
 Hopalong Cassidy Museum, Cambridge, destroyed by fire in 2016
 Inland Seas Maritime Museum, Vermilion, closed in 2012 in as the Great Lakes Historical Society prepares to open the National Museum of the Great Lakes in Toledo, Ohio in 2013
 Kern-Harrington Museum, Plain Township, formerly operated by the New Albany-Plain Township Historical Society
 Lake Shore Electric Railway
 Little Italy Heritage Museum, closed in 2007
 Marietta Soda Fountain & Museum, Marietta
 National Cartoon Museum
 National Inventors Hall of Fame, Akron, moved to Alexandria, Virginia
 Sara Rose Museum, Sabina
 Trapshooting Hall of Fame & Museum, Vandalia, moved to Sparta, Illinois,
 USS Radford National Naval Museum, Newcomerstown, closed in 2011, contents now at the USS Orlect Naval Museum in Lake Charles, Louisiana
 Viets House Museum, Cortland, formerly operated by the Cortland-Bazetta Historical Society, closed in 2011
 Western Reserve Model Railroad Museum, Mentor, closed in 2011

Regions 
The regional column in the table features designations used by the Ohio Museum Association:
 Central—including Columbus
 Northeast—including Cleveland
 Northwest—including Toledo
 Southeast
 Southwest—including Cincinnati & Dayton

See also 
 Nature centers in Ohio

References

External links 

 Ohio Museums Association
 Ohio Museums—over 250 listed with details

Museums
Ohio
Museums